Voice of Asia (Azııa Daýysy; , Golos Azii) is a music festival held annually in Almaty, Kazakhstan. Acts from all over Asia and other areas take part. The usual venue for the festival is the outdoor Medeo speed skating rink, situated on the mountainous outskirts of the Tian Shan, several kilometers away from the Almaty center.

In 2005 the event was suspended due to lack of funds.

Singing competition summary

See also
Our Sound
Asia Song Festival
Asian Wave
Asia New Singer Competition

References
 Voiceofasia.actis.kz on Internet Archive

Culture in Almaty
Music festivals in Kazakhstan
Singing competitions